Tobogganers Icefall is a prominent icefall in the west-flowing tributary to Sledgers Glacier, located at the north side of Molar Massif in the Bowers Mountains. Named by the New Zealand Antarctic Place-Names Committee (NZ-APC) in 1983 in association with nearby Sledgers Icefall from a proposal by geologist M.G. Laird.

Icefalls of Antarctica
Landforms of Victoria Land
Pennell Coast